Kelly Maxwell may refer to:

Kelly Maxwell, guitarist in band, Little Red Wolf
Kelly Maxwell, character in Ash vs Evil Dead